The Campaign to Stop Killer Robots is a coalition of non-governmental organizations who seek to pre-emptively ban lethal autonomous weapons.

History
First launched in April 2013, the Campaign to Stop Killer Robots has urged governments and the United Nations to issue policy to outlaw the development of lethal autonomous weapons systems, also known as LAWS. Several countries including Israel, Russia, South Korea, the United States, and the United Kingdom oppose the call for a preemptive ban, and believe that existing international humanitarian law is sufficient enough regulation for this area.

In December 2018, a global Ipsos poll quantified growing public opposition to fully autonomous weapons. It found that 61% of adults surveyed across 26 countries oppose the use of lethal autonomous weapons systems. Two-thirds of those opposed thought these weapons would “cross a moral line because machines should not be allowed to kill," and more than half said the weapons would be “unaccountable." A similar study across 23 countries was conducted in January 2017, which showed 56% of respondents were opposed to the use of these weapons.

In November 2018, the United Nations Secretary-General António Guterres called for a ban on killer robots, stating, "For me there is a message that is very clear – machines that have the power and the discretion to take human lives are politically unacceptable, are morally repugnant, and should be banned by international law."

In July 2018, over 200 technology companies and 3,000 individuals signed a public pledge to "not participate nor support the development, manufacture, trade, or use of lethal autonomous weapons." In July 2015, over 1,000 experts in artificial intelligence signed on to a letter warning of the threat of an arms race in military artificial intelligence and calling for a ban on autonomous weapons. The letter was presented in Buenos Aires at the 24th International Joint Conference on Artificial Intelligence (IJCAI-15) and was co-signed by Stephen Hawking, Elon Musk, Steve Wozniak, Noam Chomsky, Skype co-founder Jaan Tallinn and Google DeepMind co-founder Demis Hassabis, among others.

In June 2018, Kate Conger, then a journalist for Gizmodo and now with the New York Times, revealed Google's involvement in Project Maven, a US Department of Defense-funded program that sought to autonomously process video footage shot by surveillance drones. Several Google employees resigned over the project, and 4,000 other employees sent a letter to Sundar Pichai, the company's chief executive, protesting Google's involvement in the project and demanding that Google not "build warfare technology." Facing internal pressure and public scrutiny, Google released a set of Ethical Principles for AI which included a pledge to not develop artificial intelligence for use in weapons and promised not to renew the Maven contract after it expires in 2019.

The campaign won the Ypres Peace Prize in 2020 and was nominated for the 2021 Nobel Peace Prize by Norwegian MP Audun Lysbakken.

Stop Killer Robots are due to release a documentary called Immoral Code in May 2022 on the subject of automation and killer robots. The film is due to premiere at Prince Charles Cinema in London's Leicester Square and examines whether there are situations where it’s morally and socially acceptable to take life, and importantly - would a computer know the difference?

Steering committee members
The full membership list of the Campaign to Stop Killer Robots is available on their website.

Amnesty International
Handicap International
Human Rights Watch
International Committee for Robot Arms Control
Nobel Women's Initiative
Pax Christi International
Pugwash Conferences on Science and World Affairs
Women's International League for Peace and Freedom

Countries calling for a prohibition on fully autonomous weapons 

 Pakistan on 30 May 2013
 Ecuador on 13 May 2014 
 Egypt on 13 May 2014 
 Holy See on 13 May 2014 
 Cuba on 16 May 2014 
 Ghana on 16 April 2015 
 Bolivia on 17 April 2015 
 State of Palestine on 13 November 2015  
 Zimbabwe on 12 November 2015 
 Algeria on 11 April 2016 
 Costa Rica on 11 April 2016 
 Mexico on 13 April 2016 
 Chile on 14 April 2016 
 Nicaragua on 14 April 2016
 Panama on 12 December 2016
 Peru on 12 December 2016
 Argentina on 12 December 2016
 Venezuela on 13 December 2016
 Guatemala on 13 December 2016
 Brazil on 13 November 2017
 Iraq on 13 November 2017
 Uganda on 17 November 2017
 Austria on 9 April 2018
 Djibouti on 13 April 2018
 Colombia on 13 April 2018
 El Salvador on 22 November 2018
 Morocco on 22 November 2018

See also
 The Truth About Killer Robots (2018 documentary)

References

External links

Arms control
Military robots